The Genting Klang–Pahang Highway or officially Jalan Genting Klang and Jalan Pahang, as it is locally known (Federal Route 2), is a major highway in Kuala Lumpur, Malaysia.

The Genting Klang–Pahang Highway connects a number of urban and residential areas like Titiwangsa, Sentul, Setapak, Taman P.Ramlee Wangsa Maju, Taman Bunga Raya, Taman Melati, Taman Permata, Hulu Kelang, Taman Melawati and Universiti Tunku Abdul Rahman to the city.

Most locals do not consider it a highway as, unlike the other highways which are "closed" roads, Jalan Genting Klang is also a busy road with many commercial properties and condominiums, which are popular among students of Universiti Tunku Abdul Rahman.

The road is so named because it is the main gateway from downtown Kuala Lumpur to Pahang and the east coast. It is part of Federal Route . The 0 km-mark of the East Coast Expressway  is also located here.

History
The highway was upgraded from single carriageway to dual carriageway in the 1980s. In 1995, the highway was taken over by the Metramac Corporation Sdn Bhd which also managed the Cheras Highway (Federal Route 1), East–West Link Expressway and Kuala Lumpur–Seremban Expressway (both E37). The Jalan Pahang toll plaza (city centre bound) was in operation from 1 August 1995 and the motorist would pay the RM 0.50 tolls until the toll plaza was abolished 13 August 2004. This highway is now maintained by the Kuala Lumpur City Hall or Dewan Bandaraya Kuala Lumpur (DBKL).

Development
The Jalan Genting Klang stretch from Setapak to Klang Gates was upgraded from four lanes to a six-lane dual carriageway. The upgrading works started on 2012 and were completed on 2015. The project was undertaken by Seroja Angerrik Development; the two-phase upgrading works started from the junction at Jalan 1/27A to the MRR2, while phase two which was completed on 15 July 2015, continued on from Jalan Air Panas to Jalan 1/27A. The total cost for the entire project was RM 39.6 million.

Landmarks
 Universiti Tunku Abdul Rahman
 Wardieburn Camp
 Royal Selangor Pewter Factory at Setapak Industrial Area.
 P. Ramlee Memorial at Jalan Dedap, Taman P. Ramlee (formerly known as Taman Forlong)
 Courts Mammouth Superstore, a superstore which was formerly known as Reach Superstore was opened in 1994.
 Jamiul Ehsan Mosque, one of the oldest mosques in Kuala Lumpur
 McDonald's Jalan Pahang Drive Thru, the first McDonald's drive thru in Malaysia, opened on 19 December 1988.
 Hospital Tawakal
 Pekeliling Flats
 Bulatan Pahang roundabout
 Hospital Kuala Lumpur

List of interchanges

References 

Highways in Malaysia
Roads in Kuala Lumpur